Ginger milk curd, also known as ginger-juice milk curd, ginger milk pudding or simply ginger milk, is a Chinese hot dessert originated in Shawan Ancient Town, Panyu District, Guangzhou in the Guangdong Province in southern China. The main ingredients are ginger, milk, and sugar. Water buffalo milk is used in the original recipe.

Method of preparation
First, cut a piece of old ginger into small pieces and finely grind the ginger. Then, squeeze the juice out by pressing the ginger through a sieve. Put the juice into a bowl. Next, bring the milk to a boil and dissolve sugar in milk. Take off heat and allow it to cool a little. If one is available, place a kitchen thermometer into the milk. In the meantime, stir the ginger juice thoroughly. When the milk temperature decreases to around 70-75 °C, pour the milk quickly into the middle of the ginger juice. Wait for two to three minutes. The milk will then be curdled, and may be eaten with a spoon.

Underlying biochemical principle
The most important part of the ginger in ginger milk curd is the ginger protease zingipain. This substance with molecular weight of 31 kDa is found with three forms of isoelectric point values around 5.58, 5.40, and 5.22, respectively. The three forms have very similar biochemical behavior, where the optimal proteolytic activity is from 40 to 60°C and maximum clotting activity at 70°C.

Milk is a substance consisting mainly of milk fat globules and casein micelles in a continuous phase of water, sugar, whey protein and minerals. Casein micelles consist of mainly α(s1)-casein, α(s2)-casein, β-casein, and κ-casein, where hydrophobic α and β-casein are in the inner sub-micelle and hydrophilic κ-casein is in the outer part.

When the milk starts curdling, the curds are small, but as coagulation increases, curd size increases until the milk ends up with a tofu-like structure. When the curdling occurs, the ginger protease cuts open the κ-casein so that the hydrophilic C-terminus and the hydrophobic N-terminus separate. This disrupts the stability of the casein micelle. In the hydrophobic effect, the hydrophobic casein coagulates.

See also
Douhua
Junket (dessert)
 List of Chinese desserts
 List of desserts

References

External links
Ginger milk curd photos

Chinese desserts
Cantonese cuisine
Curd
Macau cuisine
Puddings
Ginger dishes
Milk dishes